Abbekås is a locality situated in Skurup Municipality, Skåne County, Sweden with 729 inhabitants in 2010.

References 

Populated places in Skurup Municipality
Populated places in Skåne County